, also known as Sado-no-kami or Etchū-no-kami, was a Japanese samurai daimyō of the mid-Edo period.

The Ogasawara were identified as one of the fudai or insider daimyō clans which were hereditary vassals or allies of the Tokugawa, in contrast with the tozama or outsider clans.

Shogunate official
Nagashige served the Tokugawa shogunate as its eleventh Kyoto shoshidai in the period spanning October 17, 1691, through May 15, 1702.  He had previously been shogunate's magistrate or overseer of the country's temples and shrines (jisha-bugyō) from  Genroku 3, the 3rd day of the 12th month, through Genroku 4, the 26th day of the 4th month (1691).

He was responsible for bringing Yamada Sōhen, a disciple of Sen Sōtan, to Edo to promulgate the practice of the Japanese tea ceremony.

See also
 Ogasawara clan

References

Further reading
 Sasaki Suguru. (2002). 戊辰戦争 : 敗者の明治維新 (Boshin sensō : haisha no Meiji ishin). Tokyo: 中央公論社 (Chūōkōron-shinsha). ;  OCLC 33505801

Daimyo
Rōjū
Ogasawara clan
Kyoto Shoshidai
1650 births
1732 deaths